Sambangalou  Hydroelectric Power Station is a proposed hydropower plant in Senegal, with planned capacity installation of  when completed.

Location
The power station is located on Gambia River, in Kédougou Region, in southeastern Senegal, close to the border with Guinea. The approximate coordinates of Sambangalou Hydroelectric Power Station are: 12°23'57.0"N, 12°11'48.0"W (Latitude:12.399167; Longitude:-12.196667).

Overview
This power station is a component of a multi-purpose project aimed at (a) providing electricity to the four countries of the Organisation for the Development of the Gambia River  (OMVG), namely; Senegal, Guinea-Bissau, Guinea and the Gambia, (b) supplying irrigation water to the farming communities in the region and (c) providing a source of drinking water to the residents of the area.  

The OMVG, which owns and is developing the tiered project and power station, selected a consortium of French and Austrian companies to execute the developments. The project will be developed in phases: Phase I involves the building of access roads, construction of staff houses for the construction crews and the erection of Kédougou Bridge. Phase III involves the installation of the electro-mechanical equipment into the power station, capable of generating 128 megawatts of electricity.

Developers
The table below illustrates the composition of the consortium that was selected to develop the power station and related infrastructure, at a contract price of €388 million.

Funding
The list of funders for this project include, but is not limited to, the following entities:

Other considerations
Prior to the award of the construction contract in December 2020,  Environmental and Social Impact Assessment (ESIA) studies were carried out and a Resettlement Action Plan (RAP) was developed during the preceding 18 months. An estimated 1,000 jobs are expected to be created locally, during the construction period.

The power generated at this power station will be evacuated via four 225kV high voltage power lines to locations in each of the four beneficiary countries, where the energy will be integrated into each of the national electricity grids.

Construction is expected to commence during the first half of 2021, with commercial commissioning expected in 2025. After the project has been concluded, the water treatment and distribution system, will be donated to the local community.

See also

References

External links
VINCI signed the contract to build the Sambangalou dam in Senegal As of 10 December 2020.

Hydroelectric power stations in Senegal
Proposed hydroelectric power stations
Kédougou Region